Eight teams participated in wheelchair rugby at the 2008 Summer Paralympics in Beijing, China. Teams could have up to 12 players, but no more than 11 of the team members could be male. In wheelchair rugby, each player is given a sport class based on their upper body function. The classification is a 7-level score ranging from 0.5 to 3.5, with lower scores corresponding to more severe disability. The sum score of all a team's players on the field could not exceed 8.

















References 
 

2008 rosters